Cirripectes perustus, the flaming blenny, is a species of combtooth blenny found in coral reefs in the Pacific and Indian oceans. This species reaches a length of  TL.

References

perustus
Fish described in 1959